Love Destiny: The Movie, known in Thai as Bupphesanniwat 2 (Love Destiny 2) is a 2022 Thai historical romance film directed by Adisorn Tresirikasem. It is co-produced by GDH 559 and Broadcast Thai Television, and is one of the two sequel projects to the highly successful 2018 television drama Love Destiny, the other being the TV drama Love Destiny 2. The film stars Ranee Campen and Thanavat Vatthanaputi, who play 19th-century Rattanakosin-era reincarnations of their characters from the original drama, which was set in the Ayutthaya Kingdom of the 17th century. The film was released on 28 July 2022.

References

2022 romance films
Thai-language films
Thai historical films
GDH 559 films
2022 films